Acacia oxyclada is a shrub belonging to the genus Acacia and the subgenus Phyllodineae that is endemic to western Australia.

Description
It has short, straight, slender, ascending to inclined glabrous branchlets that taper to a rigid and sharp point. Like most species of Acacia it has phyllodes rather than true leaves. The evergreen and erect phyllodes have a linear to narrowly oblong shape and are horizontally flattened. It blooms from August to October and produces yellow flowers. The obloid shaped flower-heads contain 20 to 25 golden coloured flowers. Following flowering seed pods form.

Taxonomy
The species was first formally described by the botanist George Bentham in 1864 as part of the work Flora Australiensis. It was reclassified by Leslie Pedley in 2003 as Racosperma oxycladum then transferred back to genus Acacia in 2006. It is often confused with Acacia ulicina.

Distribution
It is native to an area in the Mid West and Wheatbelt regions of Western Australia where it is found on sandplains and rocky hills growing in sandy and loamy lateritic soils. It has a disjunct distribution with the bulk of the population situated from around Northampton in the north down to around Kalbarri in the south. with collections from near Moora and Lake Varley as a part of low shrubland communities composed of species of Acacia and Melaleuca.

See also
List of Acacia species

References

oxyclada
Acacias of Western Australia
Taxa named by George Bentham
Plants described in 1864